Mount Hutton is a suburb of the City of Lake Macquarie, New South Wales, Australia, located  from Newcastle's central business district on the eastern side of Lake Macquarie. It is part of the City of Lake Macquarie North Ward.

During the mid-2010s, the suburbs experienced an increase in new home construction, partly due to the suburb's proximity to the Charlestown metropolitan hub.

The Lake Macquarie Fair shopping centre is one of the features of the suburb.

References

External links
 History of Mount Hutton (Lake Macquarie City Library)

Suburbs of Lake Macquarie